The Fischler–Susskind mechanism, first proposed by Willy Fischler and Leonard Susskind in 1998, is a holographic prescription based on the particle horizon.

The Fischler–Susskind prescription is used to obtain the maximum number of degrees of freedom per Planck volume at the Planck era, compatible with the holographic principle.

References

Physical cosmology